Adebayo Bolaji (born 15 May 1983) is a London-based painter, actor, writer and director.

Early life 
Adebayo Tibabalase Bolaji was born in Perivale in the London Borough of Ealing, of Nigerian parents and is an English actor, writer and director. Bolaji began his acting career when he was 14 with the National Youth Music Theatre making his West End debut in their 1997 production of Bugsy Malone at the Queen's Theatre. With NYMT he performed at the Edinburgh Festival three times, in Tokyo, at the Palace Theatre and the Lyceum Theatre in the West End.

Education 
Bolaji graduated from London Guildhall University with a degree in Law but went on to train at the Central School of Speech and Drama.

Career as an Actor, Director & Writer 
Bolaji originated the role of the Subway Ghost in the award-winning Ghost the Musical, directed by Matthew Warchus and produced by Colin Ingram. Music and lyrics written by Eurythmics' frontman, Dave Stewart and the Grammy award-winning Glen Ballard. Bolaji appeared in Skyfall directed by the Oscar-winning Sam Mendes, as one of the henchmen of Silva, played by Javier Bardem and was also cast in Tom Hooper's movie version of Les Misérables but had to withdraw due to film schedule conflicts.

In May 2013, Bolaji was cast in the Menier Chocolate Factory's production of The Color Purple and the Young Vic's production of Susan Stroman's London premiere of The Scottsboro Boys.

Bolaji's first play Ugly Butterflies was performed at the Central School of Speech and Drama while still in training. Bolaji's second play, In Bed, was written and produced at The Questors Theatre with Ex Nihilo, the theatre company he set up in 2009.

In 2017, Ochre Press (an independent arts publication), published Bolaji's first poetry book We Are Elastic Ideas. The book contains original drawings and poetry all combined poetically in a limited and non-limited edition.

In December 2018, Bolaji's theatre company Ex Nihilo will be showing Jacky Ivimy's play 'Dialektikon' at the Park Theatre which, Bolaji will direct. The play originally is based on the famous counter culture event in 1967, the Dialectics of Liberation.

Career as Painter 
Bolaji is a self-taught artist and came to work with the medium of paint later on in his acting career. In an interview with Vanessa Murrell via DATEAGLE ART, he stated "acting and law offer great tools, such as asking the right questions". His work as a painter mainly deals with the process and narrative of change, and very much champions the artistic process being as important as the end result. Finding the likes of Francis Bacon, Dubuffet and Jean-Michel Basquiat and ideas that run back to the 1960s Oshogbo Art Movement in Nigeria, as part inspirations. In his own words:

"Painting for me, can very much be like improvisation or devising in the theatre. One puts an idea of a kind down and one responds (truthfully) to it ... It's a constant conversation a visual dialogue with the subject matter always at the centre, until one arrives at the image which arguably has always been there since, I am always asking myself what is necessary ... Or responding honestly (as best as I can) to each part. Consequently, I arrive at the final image and know my part of the conversation is done, it's now left for others to view it and have their own opinion/dialogue ... Irrespective of mine." 

In 2016 Bolaji was chosen as Tangle's commissioned artist for Yinka Shonibare's MBE renowned Guest Projects Space, in Hackney London, for emerging artists, subsequently Bolaji was selected to show his works at long standing contemporary gallery Galerie Proarta, in Zürich Switzerland.

Personal life 
Bolaji currently lives in London and also a percussionist.

Filmography

References

External links 
 http://officialade.com/

1983 births
Living people
English male musical theatre actors
People from the London Borough of Ealing
English people of Nigerian descent
Alumni of the Royal Central School of Speech and Drama
Alumni of London Guildhall University
Male actors from London
English people of Yoruba descent
Yoruba male actors